Robert J. Ross is president and CEO and member of the board of directors of Inasmuch Foundation and Ethics and Excellence in Journalism Foundation, two of Oklahoma’s largest private foundations, which make millions of dollars in donations a year to projects across the nation.

Both foundations were started by Edith Kinney Gaylord in 1982. The Inasmuch Foundation is dedicated to funding projects to improve health, education, arts and the environment in Oklahoma. The Ethics and Excellence in Journalism Foundation's mission is to invest in the future of journalism by building the ethics, skills and opportunities needed to advance principled, probing news and information.

Career and Education

Ross previously was employed as an attorney with the Oklahoma City law firm McAfee & Taft. He is a graduate of Bishop McGuinness Catholic High School in Oklahoma City and Washington and Lee University in Virginia, where he received a Bachelor of Science in Business Administration. At W&L, he was a co-chairman of the 1996 Mock Convention, which correctly predicted that Bob Dole would receive the Republican presidential nomination. After attending W&L, he received his J.D. from the University of Oklahoma.

Involvement

In 2000, Ross was an alternate delegate to the Republican National Convention, representing the Oklahoma Republican party on the floor of the national convention. Ross is also a member of the following Boards of Directors: Colorado College, Greater Oklahoma City Chamber of Commerce, Maverick Pac Oklahoma, Oklahoma City Museum of Art, Oklahoma City National Memorial and Museum, Oklahoma City Public Schools Foundation, Oklahoma City University, Oklahoma Health Center Foundation, Smart Start Central Oklahoma, St. Anthony Hospital Foundation, Sunbeam Family Services, Oklahoma City Educare and Tulsa Educare.

Honors and awards

In 2007, Ross received the national Beyond Z Award, presented at the KIPP School Summit, for his dedication and support to KIPP Reach College Preparatory in Oklahoma City.

In 2009, Ross received the distinguished University of Oklahoma Regent’s Award, the University’s highest honor bestowed on alumni.

In addition, under Ross's leadership, Inasmuch Foundation was honored by the Boys & Girls Clubs of Oklahoma County as the Champion of Youth 2009.

Personal life
Ross was born in Oklahoma City, Oklahoma on January 11, 1974, to William Jarboe and Mary Lillian Ross. He is married to Heather Nicole Ross and has a daughter, Lillian Margaret Ross, and a son, Francis Joseph Ross. He lives in Oklahoma City.

References

External links
Voices of Oklahoma interview with William Ross. First person interview conducted on January 20, 2012, with William Ross, father of Robert J. Ross.

Living people
1974 births
American chief executives
American philanthropists